Xiangcheng is a county-level city in Zhoukou, Henan, People's Republic of China. It borders Shenqiu to the east, Shangcai to the west, Huaiyang to the north, Pingyu to the southeast, and the province of Anhui in the southeast.

Xiangcheng is known to be the birthplace of the first president of the Republic of China, Yuan Shikai.

Administrative divisions
As 2012, this city is divided to 6 subdistricts, 12 towns and 3 townships.
Subdistricts

Towns

Townships
Yongfeng Township
Fanji Township
Sanzhang Township

Climate

References

External links
Official website of Xiangcheng City government

Cities in Henan
County-level divisions of Henan
Zhoukou